Michel Voïta (born 1 March 1957) is a Swiss actor. He appeared in more than sixty films since 1983.

Selected filmography

References

External links
 

1957 births
Living people
Swiss male film actors
Swiss male television actors
20th-century Swiss male actors
21st-century Swiss male actors